Mitchell-Shealy House, also known as the Berley Shealy House, is a historic home located at Batesburg-Leesville, Lexington County, South Carolina. It was built about 1855, and is a two-story weatherboard residence that combines Greek Revival and Italianate features. It consists of a rectangular central block and one-story, centered rear ell. It features a central projecting double portico beneath a front gable.

It was listed on the National Register of Historic Places in 1982.

References

Houses on the National Register of Historic Places in South Carolina
Greek Revival houses in South Carolina
Italianate architecture in South Carolina
Houses completed in 1855
Houses in Lexington County, South Carolina
National Register of Historic Places in Lexington County, South Carolina